The 47th World Science Fiction Convention (Worldcon), also known as Noreascon 3 (or "...Three", or "...III"), was held on 31 August–4 September 1989 at the Sheraton-Boston Hotel, Hilton Hotel, Boston Park Plaza, and the Hynes Convention Center in Boston, Massachusetts, United States.

The chairman was Mark L. Olson.

Participants 

Attendance was 6,837, out of 7,795 paid memberships.

Guests of Honor 

 Andre Norton (pro)
 Ian & Betty Ballantine (pro)
 The Stranger Club (fan)

The Stranger Club is the first known science fiction club in the Boston area, and the organizers of Boskone I, New England's first science fiction convention, in 1941. Seven surviving members of the latter group attended, including Harry Stubbs (Hal Clement).

Awards

1989 Hugo Awards 

The 1989 Hugo Award base honored the 50th anniversary of both the 1939 New York World's Fair and the first Worldcon.

 Best Novel: Cyteen by C. J. Cherryh
 Best Novella: "The Last of the Winnebagos" by Connie Willis
 Best Novelette: "Schrödinger's Kitten" by George Alec Effinger
 Best Short Story: "Kirinyaga" by Mike Resnick
 Best Non-Fiction Book: The Motion of Light in Water by Samuel R. Delany
 Best Dramatic Presentation: Who Framed Roger Rabbit
 Best Professional Editor: Gardner Dozois
 Best Professional Artist: Michael Whelan
 Best Semiprozine: Locus, edited by Charles N. Brown
 Best Fanzine: File 770, edited by Mike Glyer
 Best Fan Writer: Dave Langford
 Best Fan Artist:
 Brad Foster and
 Diana Gallagher Wu (tie)

Other awards 

 Special Award: SF-Lovers Digest for pioneering the use of computer bulletin boards in fandom
 Special Award: Alex Schomburg for lifetime achievement in science fiction art
 John W. Campbell Award for Best New Writer: Michaela Roessner

See also 

 Hugo Award
 Science fiction
 Speculative fiction
 World Science Fiction Society
 Worldcon

References

External links 

 Noreascon website
 NESFA.org: The Long List
 NESFA.org: 1989 convention notes 

1989 conferences
1989 in Boston
1989 in the United States
August 1989 events in the United States
Culture of Boston
Science fiction conventions in the United States
September 1989 events in the United States
Worldcon